Shvanidzor is a village in the Meghri Municipality of the Syunik Province in southeastern Armenia, near Armenia's border with Iran.

Toponymy 
The village was also known as Shirvanadzor and Astazor.

History
According to local historical sources, Shvanidzor was founded in the 13th century, and at the time counted more than 700 households, and was located in the place of the historic settlement of Areviq. The lands of the community were cultivated for more than 700 years, which resulted in the formation of agricultural landscapes. Due to the lack of irrigation and lowland fertility, the community was relocated several times. In the vicinity of the village, there are numerous remnants of 17th- and 18th-century dwellings.

The community is known for its medieval kahrezes (qanat), a system of underground water channels and intake facilities. These deep channels are located 50-60m from each other. There are 5 kahrezes in Shvanidzor. Four of them were constructed in the 12th-14th centuries, even before the village was founded. The fifth kahrez was constructed in 2005. Potable water runs through the first, the second and the fifth kahrezes. Kahrez III and IV are in a quite poor condition. In the summer, especially in July and August, the amount of water reaches its minimum, creating a critical situation in the water supply system.

Culture
Shvanidzor is famous for its historical monuments. Close to the community there is an old bridge (17th century), as well as Gyumerants, St. Stepanos (17th-19th centuries), Berdikar (12th-13th century) churches and the Baba-Hadji Mausoleum (17th century). There is also an aqueduct of 16th century. This currently functioning aqueduct is the most important historical monument of such type remaining from the medieval times in Armenia.

Having a long history, Shvanidzor has preserved several specific traditions and rituals. The most celebrated holidays were Easter, Palm Sunday, Wine Blessing etc. Pilgrimage was also quite spread among the inhabitants. For many centuries Shvanidzor has been a residence of meliks, which is reflected in many legends and traditions.

The community members were traditionally engaged in hunting, fishing, animal husbandry, gardening, winery. Part of the community were skillful craftsmen, especially smiths, tailors, carpenters, masons, mat weavers etc.

Demographics 
The Statistical Committee of Armenia reported its population was 306 in 2010, down from 330 at the 2001 census. The main occupations of the inhabitants are gardening, animal husbandry and beekeeping.

Geography and nature

Shvanidzor is located 10 km away from Shikahogh State Preserve. Vicinity of the village have been designated as Prime Butterfly Area.

Flora
Shvanidzor is located in dry tropics. The indicators of tropics are wild pomegranate, wild fig and numerous other plants. The majority of the plants are xerophile, represented by xeromorphous shrubs. Green leafy plants are represented by araxian (Quercus araxina) and oriental oak (Q. macranthera), Georgian maple (Acer ibericum), as well as plane-tree, ash-tree, beech etc. 
Shvanidzor and its vicinities are the only places in the South Caucasus, where 2 types of European redbud (Judas tree)- Cercis griffithii Boiss. and С. siliquastrum L. Dry alpine meadows are covered with scarce shrubs and remind of desert. However, there are numerous wild herbs, including officinal, edible as well as wild relatives of cultivated plants.

Fauna
The mammals living in the area are quite known, such as Caucasian bear (Ursus arctos syriacus), Bezoarian goat (Capra aegagrus aegagrus), Armenian mouflon (Ovis orientalis gmelinii), Persian leopard (Panthera pardus tullianus), as well as badger, lynx, wild  boar, roe deer, which are listed in the Red Book. Apart from that there are also long-eared hedgehog and 3 types of bats that are listed as endangered.
Hunting and poaching still causes harm to these species, though from mammals, it is only allowed to hunt fox and hare.

Out of 66 species of birds listed in the Red Book, 15 can be met in Shvanidzor, which are Acciper Brevipes, Circaetus gallicus gallicus, Aquila rapax orientalis,  Aquila chrysaetos fulva, Gypaetus barbatus aereus, Gyps fulvus fulvus, Merops superciliosus persicus, Sylvia hortensis crassirostris,  Oenanthe xanthoprimna chrysopygia, Monticola saxalitis saxalitis, Luscinia svecica occidentalis, Remiz pendulinus menzbieri, Parus lugubris.

7 types of reptiles from the 11 in the Red Book can be met in Shvanidzor: Testudo graeca, Eumeces schneiderii, Mabuya aurata, Rhynchocalamus melanocephalus,  Telescopus fallax ibericus, Elaphe (Zamenis) hohenackeri, Montivipera raddei.

Gallery

References

External links 

REC Caucasus. 2008. Sustainable Development of Mountain Communities in the Caucasus. Local Agenda 21. Report.
Syunik Marz
Shikahogh State Preserve
'SOS! Shikahogh': the road to nowhere

Populated places in Syunik Province